Asit Kumar Haldar (10 September 1890 – 13 February 1964) was an Indian painter of Bengal school and an assistant of Rabindranath Tagore at Shantiniketan. He was one of the major artists of the Bengal renaissance.

Early life
Haldar was born in Jorasanko in 1890. His maternal grandmother was the sister of Rabindranath Tagore, making him Tagore's grandnephew. Both his grandfather Rakhaldas Haldar and his father Sukumar Haldar were accomplished in the art of painting. He began his studies at the age of 14. His education was undertaken at Government School of Art, Calcutta and began in 1904. Haldar learned sculpting from two famous Bengali artists in 1905 – Jadu Pal and Bakkeswar Pal, and he also learned from Leonard Jennings.

Career
From 1909 to 1911 he was in the Ajanta documenting the paintings on the frescoes. He did this on an expedition with Lady Herringham, and in conjunction with two other Bengali painters, the object of which was to bring cave art to a wider Indian audience. In 1921, he undertook another expedition, this time to the Bagh Caves and his reflections on the art there indicate quite a few surrealistic depictions

From 1911 to 1915 he was an art teacher at Shantiniketan. He was also the principal of the Kala Bhavan school from 1911 to 1923, assisting Tagore with cultural and artistic activities. During this time, he introduced many different styles to art to the students, and revolutionized decorative and ceremonial displays there.

In 1923, he went on a study tour through England, France and Germany. On his return, he became Principal of the Maharaja’s School of Arts and Crafts, Jaipur where he remained for a year, before moving to the Government School of Arts and Crafts in Lucknow in the year 1925 as principal and worked till 1945.

Work

Art
Haldar made a tour of Europe in 1923 and soon realized that Realism in European art had numerous limitations. He sought to balance physical attributes in proportion to the magnitude of the subject matter. Haldar's Yashoda and Krisna was not just a religious painting but an artistic juxtaposition of the infinite (represented by Krishna with the finite (represented by Yashoda). Haldar also made thirty two paintings on the Buddha's life and thirty paintings on Indian history, attempting to embrace idealism in his art. His media included: lacquer, tempera, oil, watercolors, and even ranged to some photography.

His masterpieces include:
Krsna and Yashoda
Awakening of Mother India
Rai-Raja Lotus
Kunala and Ashoka
Raslila
The Flame of Music
Pronam

Poetry
Haldar was a budding poet throughout his life. He translated Kalidasa's Meghadoota ("Cloud messenger") and Ritusamhara (Cycle of the seasons) into Bengali from Sanskrit. He also illustrated numerous poems in visual art, including twelve from Omar Khayyam. His art on the Buddha and the History of India fell under this poetic umbrella. He is also the author of various books in Bengali, viz. Ajanta (A travelogue to the Caves of Ajanta), Ho-der Galpo (The life and culture of the Ho tribe), Bagh Guha and Ramgarh (Another travelogue to the Bagh Cave and Ramgarh in Central India, etc. A newly annotated edition of Ajanta has recently been published by Lalmati, Kolkata, with annotations, additions and photographs by Prasenjit Dasgupta and Soumen Paul. A newly annotated edition of Bagguha and Ramgarh written by Asit Kumar Halder has been published by New Age Publishers, Kolkata, with annotations, additions and photographs by Prasenjit Dasgupta and Soumen Paul.

Tributes

Haldar was the first Indian to be appointed as the principal of a Government Art School. He was also the first Indian to be elected a Fellow of the Royal Society of Arts, London in 1934. The Allahabad Museum opened a large "Haldar Hall" with many of his works in 1938.

References

1890 births
1964 deaths
Bengali Hindus
Bengali male artists
Tagore family
Vangiya Sahitya Parishad
Government College of Art & Craft alumni
University of Calcutta alumni
Artists from Kolkata
Academic staff of Visva-Bharati University
Indian art educators
Bengali educators
20th-century Indian painters
Indian male painters
Educators from West Bengal